Tarabya is a neighbourhood in the Sarıyer district of Istanbul, Turkey. It is located on the European shoreline of the Bosphorus strait, between the neighbourhoods of Yeniköy and Kireçburnu. It is famous for its coastal fish restaurants.

Geography 
Compared to other neighborhoods in Sarıyer, Tarabya has much more greenery and fresher air thanks to the northern winds coming from the sea. With its massive oak tree, the Huber Mansion and a marina which houses tens of boats and yachts, it is one of the most famous neighborhoods in Istanbul. Some of the areas now controlled by Marmara University used to be the waterside mansion of Alexander Ypsilantis. The last station of the M2 (Istanbul Metro), Hacıosman (Istanbul Metro) is located here, approximately 3 kilometers from the coast.

History 
The area used to be called Pharmakia. This name is believed to have been given here by Medea, the names means "poison" in Ancient Greek. According to tradition, Attikos, an Orthodox patriarch was uncomfortable with the name being related to poison, so changed it to "Therapia". Therapia was conquered by the Ottomans in 1453. Then a minor Byzantine castle, it fell during the first few days of the Fall of Constantinople, and 40 Roman soldiers surrendered. They were hanged while the siege was ongoing. 
While in the 17th century it was known as a Greek Orthodox village, over a hundred years later it was noted that a few Armenians and Muslims also lived there. Over time, it turned into a tiny fishing village almost completely inhabited by Orthodox Christians. The village was completely transformed after becoming the centre of the Terkos Metropolis in 1655, and thanks to its new religious position and relative proximity to Constantinople, became one of the most important settlements on the European side of the Bosphorus. Due to its great climate and safety from diseases such as Cholera, many members of the Greek aristocracy moved their place of residence here. Many foreign embassies and merchants also started to move here. It eventually became the favourite place of the ruling Greek class in Constantinople. Some Greek families protected their property here until 1821, after which they were confiscated. For example the German and French summer palaces used to belong to Greek families.

The town remained mostly Greek until around the middle of the 20th century. According to Christoforos Kristidis, in 1955, Tarabya had 144 families and the Greeks maintained a primary school, a boarding school and a sports club. During the Istanbul pogrom, a church built in 1796 was put to fire. Some of the icons were transferred to a nearby church. Later, due to the worsening Turkish-Greek relations and the invasion of Cyprus, most Greeks were forced to move out. The Greek school was closed down in 1985. Around this time, around 50 Greeks -mostly elderly- lived in Tarabya.

Sights
Tarabya has many historical buildings. Churches, hotels, foreign palaces and fountains, their history dates all the way back to the 17th century. The former residence of the Metropolitan used to be right next where the Grand Tarabya Hotel is located now. A former popular hotel, Sümer Palas, built in the 1890s was demolished in the 1950s, and a new apartment complex with the same name lies there now. Hotel d'Angleterre was also built here during the Crimean War. Later in its place was built the Tokatlıyan Hotel, which got burned down in 1954. The Grand Tarabya Hotel, built in its place is the only current hotel in the neighborhood, which opened in 1966. The two notable parks are:  Atsushi Miyazaki Park and Şalcıkır park. Atsushi Miyazaki Park is dedicated to a Japanese volunteer in the 2011 Van Earthquake. Şalcıkır park is a minor park built next to the Tarabya stream. It has a children's area, basketball court and a few fitness machines. The main historical mosque is the Köstenceli Hacı Osman Mosque. The two main historical fountains are the Bezm-i Alem Valide Sultan fountain and the Sultan Mahmud II fountain. Three holy wells were also present here, two of which still exist, they are: Aya Marina, Aya Ioannis and Aya Kiriaki, which is currently in the Atsushi Miyazaki Park.

Some notable sights include:
 Church of Aya Paraskevi
 Fountain of Sultan Mahmud II
 Fountain of Bezm-i Alem Valide Sultan
 Tarabya Cultural Academy, former summer residence of the German Embassy
 Huber Mansion (currently used as the Presidential residence in Istanbul)
 Yalı of Hristaki Zoğrafos
 Yalı of Prince Ypsilantis (later summer residence of the French Embassy)
 Grand Tarabya Hotel (built on the former site of the historic Tokatlıyan Tarabya Hotel)
 Surp Andon Armenian church 
 Köstenceli Hacı Osman Mosque

Districts 

 Hacıosman
 Kalender
 Aydınevler
 Şenevler
 Ömertepe

Education

Lycée Français Pierre Loti d'Istanbul and Tarabya British Schools both have high school campuses in Tarabya.

See also
 Emirgan
 Rumelihisarı

References

http://constantinople.ehw.gr/Forms/fLemmaBodyExtended.aspx?lemmaID=11397

http://www.sariyermanset.com/iste-6-7-eylul-olaylarinin-isleri-462h.htm

https://bizansconstantin.com/2014/02/07/kaybolan-metropolitlik-binasi-aya-yorgi-kilisesi-ve-therapia/

http://www.loc.gov/pictures/item/2001699655/

https://bizansconstantin.com/2014/02/07/kaybolan-metropolitlik-binasi-aya-yorgi-kilisesi-ve-therapia/

 Bachmann, Martin: Tarabya. Alman Büyükelçisi'nin Boğaziçi'ndeki Tarihi Yazlık Rezidansının Tarihçesi ve Gelişimi. Alman Arkeoloji Enstitüsü ve Ege Yayınları, Istanbul 2003.  
 Türker, Orhan: Therapia´dan Tarabya´ya. Boğaz´ın Diplomatlar Köyünün Hikayesi. Sel Yayıncılık, Istanbul 2006.

External links 
 http://www.sariyer.bel.tr/anasayfa

Neighbourhoods of Sarıyer
Bosphorus